The Civil Marriage Act received royal assent on July 20, 2005. During the 2006 federal election campaign, Conservative leader Stephen Harper pledged to re-open the issue of same-sex marriage should his party form government. Following the Conservative victory in the election, Harper promised to bring the matter to the House of Commons of Canada "sooner than later" in the form of a resolution on whether parliament should consider a new law banning same-sex marriage. Should such a resolution pass, a new bill would have to pass both the House of Commons and the Senate of Canada in order to become law. (See also Members of the 39th Canadian Parliament and same-sex marriage)

The composition of the Senate has changed little since the debate on the Civil Marriage Act. Eight new Senators have been appointed since July 19, 2005 when the Civil Marriage Act passed third reading in the upper house. These are Senators Larry Campbell, Andrée Champagne, Dennis Dawson, Francis Fox, Yoine Goldstein, Sandra Lovelace Nicholas, Hugh Segal and Rod Zimmer (all are Liberals except for Champagne and Segal who are Conservatives). Four Senators have died or retired since the Bill's passage: Shirley Maheu (Liberal), William Doody (Progressive Conservative), Landon Pearson (Liberal) and James Kelleher (Conservative). Maheu and Pearson voted for the Bill, Kellehrer opposed while Doody was absent.

On December 7, 2006, a motion calling on "the government to introduce legislation to restore the traditional definition of marriage without affecting civil unions and while respecting existing same-sex marriages" was defeated in the House of Commons by a margin of 175 to 123 and Prime Minister Stephen Harper declared the issue settled pledging not to reopen it even if his party wins a majority government in the next election. Therefore, the issue will not be brought to the Senate in the foreseeable future.

The table below is a hypothetical projection of how senators might vote on the issue of same-sex marriage based on the votes of those senators who were present during the 2005 debate on the Civil Marriages Act and statements made since then by those senators and senators appointed subsequent to the vote.

Senate

(tally adjusted to remove former senators and add new senators)

For the purposes of this table, the Speaker of the Senate, who did not vote, is counted as an absentee since the official Senate tabulation does not list him as an abstainer.

Liberals

Conservatives

Independents

Progressive Conservatives

(Although the Progressive Conservative Party of Canada has merged into the Conservative Party of Canada, these senators have refused to join the new Conservative Party and have chosen to sit in the Senate as "Progressive Conservatives".)

Independent New Democrat

Same-sex marriage in Canada
2005 in LGBT history
2006 in LGBT history